Norberto Bercique Gomes Betuncal (born 31 January 1998), known as Beto, is a Portuguese professional footballer who plays as a striker for  club Udinese.

Club career

Early years
Born in Lisbon of Bissau-Guinean descent, Beto started his senior career with amateurs URD Tires in the Lisbon Football Association. In 2018 he signed with Clube Olímpico do Montijo of the third division, finishing second in the scoring charts in his only season with 21 goals.

Portimonense
Beto moved straight to the Primeira Liga on 3 June 2019, joining Portimonense S.C. on a four-year contract. He made his debut in the competition on 9 August, coming on as an 87th-minute substitute in a 0–0 home draw against Belenenses SAD. He finished the campaign with a further ten league appearances, all from the bench.

Beto scored his first goal in the Portuguese top division on 8 November 2020, but in a 3–1 away loss to FC Porto. He added ten more during the season, best in the squad.

Udinese
In the last day of the 2021 summer transfer window, Beto was transferred to Italian club Udinese Calcio on a season-long loan with an obligation to buy. He scored four times in his first ten Serie A appearances, helping his team earn six points in the process.

Beto netted a hat-trick in a 5–1 home win over Cagliari Calcio on 3 April 2022.

International career
In October 2022, Beto was named in a preliminary Portugal 55-man squad for the 2022 FIFA World Cup in Qatar.

Career statistics

References

External links

Portuguese League profile 

1998 births
Living people
Portuguese sportspeople of Bissau-Guinean descent
Black Portuguese sportspeople
Portuguese footballers
Footballers from Lisbon
Association football forwards
Primeira Liga players
Campeonato de Portugal (league) players
Clube Olímpico do Montijo players
Portimonense S.C. players
Serie A players
Udinese Calcio players
Portuguese expatriate footballers
Expatriate footballers in Italy
Portuguese expatriate sportspeople in Italy